Nebria chitralensis is a species of ground beetle in the Nebriinae subfamily that is endemic to Pakistan.

References

chitralensis
Beetles described in 1988
Beetles of Asia
Endemic fauna of Pakistan